The following is a list of the episodes of the HBO television drama Oz. Each episode addresses a particular theme, which is addressed during Augustus Hill's narratives as well as during various points in the actual episode. During the first six episodes of season 6, Hill shares the narration with another inmate. In the season 5 episode "Variety", the narratives are replaced by short songs sung by series characters, in a variety show format.

Series overview

Episodes

Season 1 (1997)
The first season of Oz stars Ernie Hudson as Warden Leo Glynn, Terry Kinney as Emerald City Unit Manager Tim McManus, Harold Perrineau as inmate and narrator Augustus Hill, and Eamonn Walker as new inmate and devout Muslim Kareem Saïd.

It also stars Kirk Acevedo as Latino inmate Miguel Alvarez, Edie Falco as correctional officer Diane Whittlesey, Rita Moreno as prison counselor Sister Peter Marie Reimondo, Tony Musante as inmate and Mafia boss Nino Schibetta, Leon Robinson as inmate Jefferson Keane, J.K. Simmons as inmate and Aryan Brotherhood leader Vernon Schillinger, Lee Tergesen as new inmate Tobias Beecher, Sean Whitesell as cannibalistic inmate Donald Groves, Dean Winters as manipulative Irish inmate Ryan O'Reily, and BD Wong as the prison chaplain Father Ray Mukada.

Recurring guest stars included Adewale Akinnuoye-Agbaje as inmate and Homeboys gang leader Simon Adebisi, Rick Fox as inmate and former basketball star Jackson Vahue, goodfella Mike G as inmate and Schibetta's right-hand man Joey D'Angelo, Stephen Gevedon as biker inmate Scott Ross, Craig muMs Grant as inmate Arnold "Poet" Jackson, Željko Ivanek as Governor James Devlin, Tim McAdams as Homeboys inmate Johnny Post, George Morfogen as long-term inmate Bob Rebadow, Steve Ryan as corrupt Officer Mike Healy, Lauren Vélez as prison doctor Gloria Nathan, and J. D. Williams as Homeboys inmate Kenny Wangler.

Season 1 chronicled the spiritual and political journeys of many of the characters as they descend into insanity, rise and fall politically, and seek redemption. The season showed how the different gangs fight each other as well as the prison system, culminating in a riot in which the inmates take over Emerald City.

Season 2 (1998)
The second season of Oz starred Kirk Acevedo as Latino inmate Miguel Alvarez, Ernie Hudson as Warden Leo Glynn, Terry Kinney as Emerald City Unit Manager Tim McManus, Rita Moreno as prison counselor Sister Peter Marie Reimondo, Harold Perrineau as inmate and narrator Augustus Hill, J.K. Simmons as reformed Aryan Brotherhood inmate Vernon Schillinger, Lee Tergesen as the mentally unstable inmate Tobias Beecher, Eamonn Walker as inmate and devout Muslim leader Kareem Saïd, and Dean Winters as manipulative Irish-American inmate Ryan O'Reily.

It also starred Adewale Akinnuoye-Agbaje as inmate and Homeboys gang leader Simon Adebisi, Edie Falco as correctional officer Diane Whittlesey, George Morfogen as long-term inmate Bob Rebadow, Lauren Vélez as prison doctor Gloria Nathan, and BD  Wong as the prison chaplain Father Ray Mukada.

Recurring guest stars included Bryan Callen as Christian inmate Jonathan Coushaine, Kathryn Erbe as death row inmate Shirley Bellinger, Bill Fagerbakke as corrupt corrections officer Karl Metzger, Rick Fox as inmate and former basketball star Jackson Vahue, Craig muMs Grant as inmate Arnold "Poet" Jackson, Luis Guzmán as new inmate and Latino gang leader Raoul "El Cid" Hernandez, Željko Ivanek as Governor James Devlin, Jordan Lage as homosexual inmate Richie Hanlon, Eddie Malavarca as inmate and new leader of the mob Peter Schibetta, Tom Mardirosian as inmate Agamemnon "The Mole" Busmalis, Mark Margolis as Peter Schibetta's godfather and new inmate Antonio Nappa, Christopher Meloni as new inmate Chris Keller, Austin Pendleton as inmate and Alzheimer's patient William Giles, Evan Seinfeld as new biker inmate Jaz Hoyt, J. D. Williams as homeboy inmate Kenny Wangler, and Scott William Winters as Ryan O'Reily's brother, Cyril O'Reily. Tony Masters played by Steven Wishnoff, Fiona Zonioni and Kiki Dowling are introduced as The Gays when Emerald City reopens in episode 2.

Season two of Oz continued to show the aftermath of the riot and the lessons each character learned from it. Throughout the course of the season, each principal character was forced to confront their own demons, and some prevailed while others faltered.

Season 3 (1999)

The third season of Oz starred Kirk Acevedo as Latino inmate Miguel Alvarez, Adewale Akinnuoye-Agbaje as inmate Simon Adebisi, Ernie Hudson as Warden Leo Glynn, Terry Kinney as Emerald City Unit Manager Tim McManus, Rita Moreno as prison counselor Sister Peter Marie Reimondo, Harold Perrineau as inmate and narrator Augustus Hill, J.K. Simmons as Aryan Brotherhood inmate Vernon Schillinger, Lee Tergesen as the mentally unstable inmate Tobias Beecher, Eamonn Walker as inmate and devout Muslim leader Kareem Saïd, and Dean Winters as manipulative Irish inmate Ryan O'Reily.

It also starred Kathryn Erbe as death row inmate Shirley Bellinger, Edie Falco as correctional officer Diane Whittlesey, Luis Guzmán as inmate and Latino gang leader Raoul "El Cid" Hernandez, Mark Margolis as inmate and Italian gang leader Antonio Nappa, Christopher Meloni as inmate Chris Keller, George Morfogen as longterm inmate Robert 'Bob' Rebadow, Lauren Vélez as prison doctor Gloria Nathan, and BD Wong as the prison chaplain Father Ray Mukada, Granville Adams as Muslim inmate Zahir Arif, Arija Bareikis as Tricia Ross, the sister of dead inmate Scott Ross, Philip Casnoff as new Russian inmate Nikolai Stanislofsky, Robert Clohessy as new head CO of Emerald City Sean Murphy, Seth Gilliam as new CO Clayton Hughes, Tom Mardirosian as inmate Agamemnon "The Mole" Busmalis, Craig muMs Grant as inmate Arnold "Poet" Jackson, Kristin Rohde as new CO Claire Howell, J. D. Williams as inmate and Homeboy gang leader Kenny Wangler, and Scott William Winters as inmate Cyril O'Reily.

Season 4 (2000–01)

Season 5 (2002)

Season 6 (2003)

References

External links
 

Lists of American drama television series episodes